Maquis may refer to:

Resistance groups 
 Maquis (World War II), predominantly rural guerrilla bands of the French Resistance
 Spanish Maquis, guerrillas who fought against Francoist Spain in the aftermath of the Spanish Civil War
 The network of rural bases operated by the Communist Party of Kampuchea prior to the Cambodian Civil War

Other uses 
 Maquis (Star Trek), fictional resistance movement in the Star Trek universe
 "The Maquis" (Star Trek: Deep Space Nine), television episode that introduced the group
 Maquis shrubland, a Mediterranean shrubland biome known as macchia in Italian
 Aristotelia chilensis, a bush in southern Chile, locally known as maqui
 Maquis (pigeon), a pigeon that received the Dickin Medal for service during the Second World War

See also 
 
 Maki (disambiguation)
 Maqui (disambiguation)
 Marquis (disambiguation)